Arctica Finance, is an Icelandic securities brokerage firm headquartered in Reykjavík. It was established in 2008 by former key employees of Landsbanki which failed during the 2008–2011 Icelandic financial crisis.

History
In 2011, the company returned a 247 million ISK profit.

In 2015, Arctica Finance bought securities brokerage firm H.F. Verðbréf for an undisclosed amount.

Arctica Finance compleated in April 2021 a Pre-IPO Private Placement round for the new airline Play (airline) with a total transaction size of $47 million in new equity.

n 2019, the company returned a 304 million ISK loss after turning in a 200 million ISK profit the year before.

Controversies
In September 2017, the company was fined by the 72 millions ISK by the Icelandic Financial Supervisory Authority which was based on the fact that dividends to employees had violated bonus rules. In March 2019, Icelandic district courts lowered the fine do 24 millions ISK. In February 2021, the Supreme Court of Iceland rejected Arctica's appeal.

In July 2021, the company was fined 700.000 ISK by the Central Bank of Iceland for breaking the laws on securities transactions by failing to adequately preserve the receipts received from clients.

References

External links 

Financial services in Iceland
Financial services companies of Iceland
Companies based in Reykjavík
2008 establishments in Iceland